The pont de Saint-Cloud (Saint-Cloud Bridge) is a French bridge constructed of metal which crosses the Seine between the communes of Boulogne-Billancourt and Saint-Cloud in the French department of Hauts-de-Seine.

The first pont de Saint-Cloud appeared in 841 because of a conflict between Charles the Bald et Lothaire I, and consisted of a wooden bridge supporting several mills. The Seine has been traversable from this location for twelve centuries, and tradition holds that no king of France has traversed it without suffering a sudden death. As a result, sovereigns have crossed the Seine by boat. The wooden bridge was demolished after the death of François I, and in 1556 his son Henri II constructed a new stone bridge consisting of eleven arches. This bridge was in turn demolished during the Second Fronde and replaced with a bridge made of wooden arches. The single-piece deck crosses the entire river, supported by six columns of reinforced concrete. In order to facilitate circulation across the banks, underground passages have been built on the two sides of the river.

A metro station on line 10 of the Paris Métro has been named after the bridge.

References

Bridges over the River Seine
Bridges completed in 1556
Bridges completed in 1940
1556 establishments in France